Cool Springs is a spring in Lewis County in the U.S. state of Missouri.

Cool Springs was so named on account of the temperature of its water.

See also
List of rivers of Missouri

References

Bodies of water of Lewis County, Missouri
Springs of Missouri